This is a comprehensive list of victories of the  cycling team. The races are categorized according to the UCI Continental Circuits rules. The team was a Continental  team in 2007 a  Professional Continental team from 2008 to 2010. In 2011 The team stepped up to the world tour until 2020 when was folded.

Sources:

2007 – BMC Racing Team
Stage 2b (TTT) Giro del Friuli-Venezia-Giulia

2008 – BMC Racing Team
Tour de Leelanau, Taylor Tolleson
Stage 3 Rochester Omnium, Antonio Cruz
 Overall Tour of Utah, Jeff Louder

2009 – BMC Racing Team
Stage 1 Tour de Beauce, Danilo Wyss
Overall Grand Prix Tell, Mathias Frank
Stage 4, Thomas Frei

2010 – BMC Racing Team
La Flèche Wallonne, Cadel Evans
 Points classification, Giro d'Italia, Cadel Evans
Stage 7 Giro d'Italia, Cadel Evans
Stage 5 & 7 Tour de Suisse, Marcus Burghardt

2011 – BMC Racing Team

 Overall Tirreno–Adriatico, Cadel Evans
Stage 6, Cadel Evans
 Overall Tour de Romandie, Cadel Evans
 Road Race Championships, Alexander Kristoff
 Time Trial Championships, Martin Kohler
 Overall Tour de France, Cadel Evans
Stage 4, Cadel Evans
Stage 6 Österreich-Rundfahrt, Greg Van Avermaet
 Overall Tour de Wallonie, Greg Van Avermaet
Stage 5, Greg Van Avermaet
Prologue Eneco Tour, Taylor Phinney
Stage 2 USA Pro Cycling Challenge, George Hincapie
Paris–Tours, Greg Van Avermaet

2012 – BMC Racing Team

 Road Race Championships, Martin Kohler
 Overall Critérium International, Cadel Evans
Stage 2 (ITT), Cadel Evans
Stage 1 (TTT), Giro del Trentino
Giro di Toscana, Alessandro Ballan
Stage 1 (ITT) Giro d'Italia, Taylor Phinney
Stage 21 (ITT) Giro d'Italia, Marco Pinotti
Stage 1 Critérium du Dauphiné, Cadel Evans
Stage 7 (ITT) Tour of Austria, Marco Pinotti
 Young rider classification in the Tour de France, Tejay van Garderen
Stage 1 Paris–Corrèze, Adam Blythe
 Overall Tour of Utah, Johann Tschopp
Stage 5, Johann Tschopp
Stage 7 Eneco Tour, Alessandro Ballan
Stage 2 USA Pro Cycling Challenge, Tejay van Garderen
Stages 9 & 19 Vuelta a España, Philippe Gilbert
Stage 7 (ITT) USA Pro Cycling Challenge, Taylor Phinney
Stage 13 Vuelta a España, Steve Cummings
Binche–Tournai–Binche, Adam Blythe
Stage 5 Tour of Beijing, Steve Cummings
 Road Race World Championships, Philippe Gilbert

2013 – BMC Racing Team

Stage 1 Tour of Qatar, Brent Bookwalter
Stage 2 (TTT) Tour of Qatar
Stage 1 Tour du Haut Var, Thor Hushovd
Stage 3 Giro del Trentino, Ivan Santaromita
 Overall Tour of California, Tejay van Garderen
Stage 6 (ITT), Tejay van Garderen
 Road Race Championships, Ivan Santaromita
 Time Trial Championships, Marco Pinotti
 National Road Race Championships, Michael Schär
 National Road Race Championships, Thor Hushovd
Stage 3 Tour of Austria, Thor Hushovd
Stages 4 & 5 Tour of Austria, Mathias Frank
 Overall Tour de Wallonie, Greg Van Avermaet
Stages 3 & 5, Greg Van Avermaet
Stages 3 & 5 Tour de Pologne, Thor Hushovd
Stage 4 Tour de Pologne, Taylor Phinney
Stage 1 Tour of Utah, Greg Van Avermaet
 Overall Arctic Race of Norway, Thor Hushovd
Stages 2 & 4, Thor Hushovd
 Overall USA Pro Cycling Challenge, Tejay van Garderen
Stage 2, Mathias Frank
Stage 5 (ITT), Tejay van Garderen
Stage 12 Vuelta a España, Philippe Gilbert
Stage 2 Tour of Alberta, Silvan Dillier
Stage 4 Tour of Alberta, Cadel Evans
Stage 1 Tour of Beijing, Thor Hushovd

2014 – BMC Racing Team

Stage 3 Tour Down Under, Cadel Evans
 Overall Dubai Tour, Taylor Phinney
Stage 1 (ITT), Taylor Phinney
 Overall Tour Méditerranéen, Steve Cummings
Stage 4 (ITT), Steve Cummings
Stage 2 Tour du Haut Var, Amaël Moinard
Stage 4 Volta a Catalunya, Tejay van Garderen
Brabantse Pijl, Philippe Gilbert
Amstel Gold Race, Philippe Gilbert
 Overall Giro del Trentino, Cadel Evans
Stage 1, Team time trial
Stage 3, Cadel Evans
Stage 5 Tour of California, Taylor Phinney
 National Time Trial Championships, Taylor Phinney
 Overall Ster ZLM Toer, Philippe Gilbert
Prologue (ITT) & Stage 3, Philippe Gilbert
 National Time Trial Championships, Peter Velits
Stage 2 Tour of Utah, Michael Schär
Stages 6 & 7 Tour of Utah, Cadel Evans
Stage 5 Eneco Tour, Greg Van Avermaet
 Overall USA Pro Cycling Challenge, Tejay van Garderen
Stages 3 & 6 (ITT), Tejay van Garderen
Grand Prix de Wallonie, Greg Van Avermaet
Primus Classic Impanis - Van Petegem, Greg Van Avermaet
 Team Time Trial World Championships
 Overall Tour of Beijing, Philippe Gilbert
Stage 2, Philippe Gilbert

2015 – BMC Racing Team

 Overall Tour Down Under, Rohan Dennis 
Stage 3, Rohan Dennis 
Stage 3 Tirreno–Adriatico, Greg Van Avermaet
Stage 4 Volta a Catalunya, Tejay van Garderen
Volta Limburg Classic, Stefan Küng
Brabantse Pijl, Ben Hermans
Stage 4 Tour de Romandie, Stefan Küng
Stage 3 Tour de Yorkshire, Ben Hermans
Stages 12 & 18 Giro d'Italia, Philippe Gilbert
 Overall Tour of Belgium, Greg Van Avermaet
Stage 4, Greg Van Avermaet
 National Time Trial Championships, Silvan Dillier
 National Road Race Championships, Danilo Wyss
Stage 3 Critérium du Dauphiné, team time trial
Stage 3 Tour of Austria, Rick Zabel
Stage 1 (ITT) Tour de France, Rohan Dennis
Stage 9 Tour de France, team time trial
Stage 13 Tour de France, Greg Van Avermaet
Grand Prix Pino Cerami, Philippe Gilbert
Stage 3 Tour de Wallonie, Philippe Gilbert
RideLondon–Surrey Classic, Jempy Drucker
Stage 3 Arctic Race of Norway, Ben Hermans
Stage 7 Eneco Tour, Manuel Quinziato
Stage 4 Arctic Race of Norway, Silvan Dillier
Stage 1 Vuelta a España, team time trial
 Overall USA Pro Cycling Challenge, Rohan Dennis
Stage 1, Taylor Phinney
Stage 2, Brent Bookwalter
Stages 4 & 5 (ITT), Rohan Dennis
Team classification
Team Time Trial World Championships

2016 – BMC Racing Team

 National Time Trial Championships, Rohan Dennis
Stage 5 Tour Down Under, Richie Porte
Stage 4 (ITT) Vuelta a Andalucía, Tejay van Garderen 
Vuelta a Murcia, Philippe Gilbert
Omloop Het Nieuwsblad, Greg Van Avermaet
Prologue (ITT) Driedaagse van West-Vlaanderen, Tom Bohli
 Overall Tirreno–Adriatico, Greg Van Avermaet
Stage 1 (TTT) 
Stage 6, Greg Van Avermaet
Stage 4 Tour of the Basque Country, Samuel Sánchez
Stage 6 (ITT) Tour of California, Rohan Dennis
 National Time Trial Championships, Taylor Phinney
Prologue Tour de Luxembourg, Jean-Pierre Drucker
Stage 2 Tour de Luxembourg, Philippe Gilbert
Stage 5 Tour de Suisse, Darwin Atapuma
Stage 7 Tour de Suisse, Tejay van Garderen
 National Time Trial Championships, Manuel Quinziato
 National Road Race Championships, Philippe Gilbert
Stage 5 Tour de France, Greg Van Avermaet
 Olympics Men's Road Race, Greg Van Avermaet
 Overall Tour du Limousin, Joey Rosskopf
Stage 1, Joey Rosskopf 
 Team classification  Vuelta a España
Stage 16, Jempy Drucker
Grand Prix Cycliste de Montréal, Greg Van Avermaet
Stage 2 (ITT) Eneco Tour, Rohan Dennis
Stage 5 (TTT) Eneco Tour

2017 – BMC Racing Team

 National Time Trial Championships, Rohan Dennis
 National Road Race Championships, Miles Scotson
 Overall Tour Down Under, Richie Porte
Stages 2 & 5, Richie Porte
Stage 5 (TTT) Volta a la Comunitat Valenciana
 Overall Tour of Oman, Ben Hermans
Stages 2 & 5 Tour of Oman, Ben Hermans
 Overall Tour La Provence, Rohan Dennis
Omloop Het Nieuwsblad, Greg Van Avermaet
Stage 1 (TTT) Tirreno–Adriatico
Stage 7 Paris–Nice, Richie Porte
Stage 7 (ITT) Tirreno–Adriatico, Rohan Dennis
Stage 2 (TTT) Volta a Catalunya
E3 Harelbeke, Greg Van Avermaet
Gent–Wevelgem, Greg Van Avermaet
Paris–Roubaix, Greg Van Avermaet
Stage 2 Tour of the Alps, Rohan Dennis
 Overall Tour de Romandie, Richie Porte
Stage 2, Stefan Küng
Stage 6 Giro d'Italia, Silvan Dillier
Stage 18 Giro d'Italia, Tejay van Garderen
 Overall Tour de Luxembourg, Greg Van Avermaet
Stage 1, Jempy Drucker
Stages 2 & 4, Greg Van Avermaet
Stage 4 (ITT)  Critérium du Dauphiné, Richie Porte
Stages 1 (ITT) & 9 (ITT)  Tour de Suisse, Rohan Dennis
 Overall Route du Sud, Silvan Dillier
 National Time Trial Championships, Jempy Drucker
 National Time Trial Championships, Stefan Küng
 National Time Trial Championships, Joey Rosskopf
 National Road Race Championships, Silvan Dillier
 Overall Tour de Wallonie, Dylan Teuns
Stage 3 & 5, Dylan Teuns
Stage 4, Jempy Drucker
 Overall Tour de Pologne, Dylan Teuns
Stage 3, Dylan Teuns
Stage 2 Tour of Utah, Brent Bookwalter
Stage 2 (ITT) BinckBank Tour, Stefan Küng
 Overall  Arctic Race of Norway, Dylan Teuns
Stages 1 & 4, Dylan Teuns
 Overall Colorado Classic, Manuel Senni

2018 – BMC Racing Team

 National Time Trial Championships, Rohan Dennis
Stage 5 Tour Down Under, Richie Porte
Stage 3 (TTT) Volta a la Comunitat Valenciana
Stage 5 Volta a la Comunitat Valenciana, Jürgen Roelandts
Stage 3 Tour of Oman, Greg Van Avermaet
Stage 4 (ITT) Abu Dhabi Tour, Rohan Dennis
Stage 1 (TTT) Tirreno–Adriatico
Stage 7 (ITT) Tirreno–Adriatico, Rohan Dennis
 Overall Tour de Yorkshire, Greg Van Avermaet
Stage 4 (ITT) Tour of California, Tejay van Garderen
Stage 16 (ITT) Giro d'Italia, Rohan Dennis
 Overall Tour de Suisse, Richie Porte
Stage 1 (TTT)
Stage 9 (ITT), Stefan Küng
 National Time Trial Championships, Joey Rosskopf
 National Time Trial Championships, Stefan Küng
Stage 3 (TTT) Tour de France
Prologue Tour of Utah, Tejay van Garderen
Stage 2 (ITT) Binck Bank Tour, Stefan Küng
Stage 1 (ITT) & 16 (ITT) Vuelta a España, Rohan Dennis
Stage 11 Vuelta a España, Alessandro De Marchi
 Time Trial, UCI Road World Championships, Rohan Dennis
Giro dell'Emilia, Alessandro De Marchi

2019 – CCC Team

 National Time Trial Championships, Patrick Bevin
Stage 2 Tour Down Under, Patrick Bevin
Stage 3 Volta a la Comunitat Valenciana, Greg Van Avermaet
Stage 4 Tour de Yorkshire, Greg Van Avermaet
Stage 3 (TTT) Hammer Stavanger
Grand Prix Cycliste de Montréal, Greg Van Avermaet

2020 – CCC Team

 National Time Trial Championships, Kamil Gradek
 National Time Trial Championships, Josef Černý
Stage 3b (ITT) Tour Poitou-Charentes en Nouvelle-Aquitaine, Josef Černý
 Overall Tour de Hongrie, Attila Valter
Stages 2, 3 & 4, Jakub Mareczko
Stage 5, Attila Valter
Stage 18 Giro d'Italia, Josef Černý

Supplementary statistics

References

wins
BMC